The Visitor is the 38th studio album by Canadian / American singer-songwriter Neil Young and his second studio album with American rock group Promise of the Real. The album was released on December 1, 2017, on Reprise Records. The album was preceded by the singles "Children of Destiny", which was released on July 4, 2017, and "Already Great", which was released on November 3, 2017 and is in response to President Donald Trump's campaign slogan of Make America Great Again.

Track listing
All tracks composed by Neil Young.

Critical reception
The Visitor has a 68/100 average on Metacritic.

Personnel

Neil Young – vocals, guitar, piano; harmonica on "Fly By Night Deal", harmonica on "Almost Always", whistle on "Change of Heart", piano on "Diggin' a Hole"
Anthony LoGerfo – drums
Corey McCormick – bass guitar, vocals
Tato Melgar – percussion
Lukas Nelson – guitar, vocals; glockenspiel, mandolin, organ on "Change of Heart"
Micah Nelson – guitar, vocals; piano on "Already Great", organ on "Carnival"

Charts

References

2017 albums
Neil Young albums
Albums produced by Neil Young
Reprise Records albums
Albums produced by John Hanlon
Lukas Nelson & Promise of the Real albums
Albums recorded at Shangri-La (recording studio)

Albums recorded at Capitol Studios